The Presteigne Festival is a classical music festival which takes place at the end of August each year in the town of Presteigne situated in the Welsh Marches.
The Festival promotes a wide variety of concerts together with many music-related activities.

History

1983	Presteigne Festival founded by a small group of local enthusiasts including Adrian Williams, the first artistic director;
1984	Mid Border Arts formed to promote both the Festival and a series of year-round arts events;
1990	Incorporation of Presteigne Festival of Music and the Arts Limited, which separated the	Festival from Mid Border Arts;
1992	Tenth anniversary ‘Open Borders’ Festival, which commissioned twelve new works, one from each of the then European Community countries;
1993	Appointment of George Vass as Artistic Director. Presteigne Festival of Music and the Arts Limited registered as a charity;
1994	Establishment of annual composer-in-residence scheme;
1999	The Festival was short listed for one of the annual Royal Philharmonic Society awards(nominated again in 2003);
2006	Pēteris Vasks first non-British composer-in-residence; Baltic music feature;
2007	25th anniversary festival which included seventeen world premieres. Australian musician Peter Sculthorpe was composer-in-residence;
2008	New executive structure introduced, which enabled the Festival to become more flexible and professional in its outlook;
2010	Introduction of a new community and education programme; introduction of an annual Competition for Composers.

Aims

The Presteigne Festival specialises in the promotion of contemporary music and programmes contemporary works alongside standard repertoire.  It supports living composers and aims to make their work more accessible.  It focuses on nurturing young performers and composers.  The festival also supports education projects for the local community.

Funding

The Presteigne Festival is a registered charity and relies on grants, sponsorship and donations from individuals to maintain its activities. The Festival receives financial support from trusts, foundations, corporate supporters, government bodies and individuals. Around a third of the income is raised from ticket sales.

Organisation

The Festival is run by a management team of three led by Artistic Director George Vass. The organisation is governed by a board of trustees. The Festival also has a president, Michael Berkeley and a group of vice-presidents – Geraint Lewis, David Matthews, Simon Mundy, Hilary Tann and Adrian Williams.

References

External links
 http://www.presteignefestival.com

Music festivals in Wales
Recurring events established in 1983
festival
Summer events in Wales